Joseph Andorfer Ewan (1909–1999) was an American botanist, naturalist, and historian of botany and natural history.

Biography
Joseph Ewan grew up in Los Angeles and developed an early interest in the study of nature. At the age of eighteen, he published an ornithological report in The Condor. He matriculated at UCLA and transferred to the University of California, Berkeley in 1933, graduating there with a B.A. in 1934. After graduating he remained at Berkeley until 1937 as a research assistant to Willis Jepson. In 1935 Ewan married a fellow botanical student, Ada Nesta Dunn (1908–2000), in Reno, Nevada. She often collaborated with him on their publications. He was from 1937 to 1944 an instructor at the University of Colorado, from 1944 to 1945 a botanist with the Foreign Economic Administration, from 1945 to 1946 an assistant curator at the Smithsonian Institution, and from 1946 to 1947 an associate botanist at the USDA's Bureau of Plant Industry. At Tulane University he became in 1947 an assistant professor and was eventually promoted to associate professor, and then full professor. There he held the Ida Richard Professorship from 1972 to 1977, when he retired as professor emeritus.

Ewan was a member of London's Society for the Bibliography of Natural History and in 1977 received its Founder's Medal.

The number of his publications exceeds 400. He wrote extensively on the history of naturalists in America and their work during the 17th, 18th, and 19th centuries. Joseph and Nesta Ewan wrote John Banister and his natural history of Virginia (1970), a Biographical dictionary of Rocky Mountain naturalists (1981), and Benjamin Smith Barton: naturalist and physician in Jeffersonian America (published posthumously in 2007).

During their long marriage, Mr. and Mrs. Ewan collected about 4,500 books and huge numbers of "offprints, newspaper clippings, photocopies, correspondence, documents and manuscript notes." In 1986 the Missouri Botanical Garden purchased the collection and in 1997 published (and placed on-line) a Guide to the Ewan Papers which lists about 10,000 names.

Joseph Ewan died in 1999. His widow died in 2000. They were survived by three daughters, Kathleen, Dorothy, and Marjorie, and five grandchildren.

References

1909 births
1999 deaths
University of California, Berkeley alumni
Tulane University faculty
20th-century American botanists
American historians of science